The Challenger Pulcra Lachiter Biella (formerly known as Canella Challenger) is a professional tennis tournament played on outdoor red clay courts. It is currently part of the Association of Tennis Professionals (ATP) Challenger Tour. It is held annually in Biella, Italy, since 1998.

Past finals

Singles

Doubles

External links
Official website
ITF search

ATP Challenger Tour
Clay court tennis tournaments
Tennis tournaments in Italy
Recurring sporting events established in 1998
1998 establishments in Italy